This is a list of the neighbourhoods and suburbs of Novi Sad.

Neighbourhoods on the left bank of the Danube
Stari Grad (Old City, City Centre)
Bulevar
Liman (Liman I, Liman II, Liman III, Liman IV)
Almaški Kraj
Podbara
Industrial Zone North 3
Salajka (Slavija)
Pervazovo Naselje (Pejinovo Naselje)
Rotkvarija
Banatić
Sajmište
Grbavica
Adamovićevo Naselje
Telep (Severni Telep, Južni Telep)
Adice
Bistrica (Novo Naselje)
Savina
Tozin Sokak (Šonsi)
Šarengrad (Jamajka)
Rasadnik (Radna Zona Zapad)
Industrial Zone West
Satelit
Mali Satelit
Tozinovac
Veternička Rampa
Detelinara (Stara Detelinara, Nova Detelinara)
Avijatičarsko Naselje (Avijacija)
Jugovićevo
Novo Groblje
Sajlovo
Industrial Zone South (Radna Zona Sever 2)
University campus
Ribarsko Ostrvo
Kameničko Ostrvo (Kamenička Ada)
Klisa (Gornja Klisa, Donja Klisa)
Slana Bara
Vidovdansko Naselje
Veliki Rit
Mali Beograd
Mišin Salaš
Industrial Zone North 1 (Radna Zona Sever 1)
Gornje Livade (Gornje Sajlovo, Šumice)
Rimski Šančevi
Deponija
Šangaj
Depresija
Industrial Zone North 4
Vrbak
Ratno Ostrvo

Neighbourhoods on the right bank of the Danube
Petrovaradin
Petrovaradin Fortress (Petrovaradinska tvrđava)
Podgrađe Tvrđave (Gradić)
Stari Majur (Old Majur)
Novi Majur (New Majur)
Bukovački Plato (Bukovački Put)
Širine
Vezirac
Široka Dolina
Sadovi
Marija Snežna (Radna Zona Istok)
Industrial Zone East 
Petrovaradinska Ada (Ribarska Ada)
Trandžament
Ribnjak
Mišeluk (Mišeluk 1, Mišeluk 2, Mišeluk 3)
Alibegovac
Karagača
Sremska Kamenica
Donja Kamenica
Gornja Kamenica
Čardak
Staroiriški Put
Tatarsko Brdo
Bocke
Popovica
Paragovo
Glavica
Artinjeva (Artiljevo)

Suburban settlements
Begeč
Budisava
Bukovac
Čenej
Futog
Kać
Kisač
Kovilj
Ledinci
Rumenka
Stari Ledinci
Stepanovićevo
Veternik
Lipov Gaj (Zepter City)
Kamenjar
Bangladeš
Nemanovci
Pejićevi Salaši
Tankosićevo

References
Jovan Mirosavljević, Brevijar ulica Novog Sada 1745–2001, Novi Sad, 2002.
Milorad Grujić, Vodič kroz Novi Sad i okolinu, Novi Sad, 2004.

See also
Novi Sad
Industrial zones in Novi Sad
List of cities, towns and villages in Vojvodina
List of places in Serbia